The Embassy of the State of Palestine in Oman is the diplomatic mission of the Palestine in Oman. It is located in Muscat.

See also

 List of diplomatic missions in Oman
 List of diplomatic missions of Palestine

References

Diplomatic missions of the State of Palestine
Diplomatic missions in Oman
Oman–State of Palestine relations